Grønfjellåga (lit. "the river of the green mountain") is a river in the municipality of Rana in Nordland county, Norway. It then flows through the Grønfjelldalen valley while absorbing several smaller rivers, before it flows out as a tributary to the river Ranelva at the Dunderforsen waterfall (also called Stupforsen).

Media gallery

References

Rana, Norway
Rivers of Nordland
Rivers of Norway